The 2014–2016 AVC Beach Volleyball Continental Cup were a beach volleyball double-gender event. The winners of the event qualified for the 2016 Summer Olympics

Men

Preliminary round

Central Asia

Subzonal
Host: Malé, Maldives
19–21 January 2015

 ,  and  advanced to the zonal round.

Zonal
Host: Kozhikode, India

  advanced to the final round.
  and  advanced to the semifinal round.

Eastern Asia

Subzonal
Host: Kaohsiung, Taiwan
7–9 November 2014

 ,  and  advanced to the zonal round.

Zonal
Host: Boryeong, South Korea

  advanced to the final round.
  and  advanced to the semifinal round.

Oceania

Subzonal
Host: Sydney, Australia
17–18 November 2014

 ,  and  advanced to the zonal round.

Zonal
Host: Rarotonga, Cook Islands

  (as the hosts) and  advanced to the final round.
  and  advanced to the semifinal round.

Southeastern Asia

Subzonal
Host: Khlong Luang, Thailand

10 November 2014

 ,  and  advanced to the zonal round.

Zonal
Host: Nong Khai, Thailand

  advanced to the final round.
  and  advanced to the semifinal round.

Western Asia
Host: Doha, Qatar

  advanced to the final round.
  advanced to the semifinal round.

Semifinal round
Host: Kalasin, Thailand

  and  advanced to the final round.

Final round
Host: Cairns, Australia

Women

Preliminary round

Central Asia
Host: Kozhikode, India

  advanced to the final round.
  and  advanced to the semifinal round.

Eastern Asia

Subzonal
Host: Kaohsiung, Taiwan
7–9 November 2014

 ,  and  advanced to the zonal round.

Zonal
Host: Boryeong, South Korea

  advanced to the final round.
  and  advanced to the semifinal round.

Oceania

Subzonal
Host: Sydney, Australia
17–18 November 2014

 ,  and  advanced to the zonal round.

Zonal
Host: Rarotonga, Cook Islands

  (as the hosts) and  advanced to the final round.
  and  advanced to the semifinal round.

Southeastern Asia

Subzonal
Host: Khlong Luang, Thailand
11–12 November 2014

 ,  and  advanced to the zonal round.

Zonal
Host: Nong Khai, Thailand

  advanced to the final round.
  and  advanced to the semifinal round.

Semifinal round
Host: Kalasin, Thailand

 ,  and  advanced to the final round.

Final round
Host: Cairns, Australia

References

External links
Official website

2014 in beach volleyball
2015 in beach volleyball
2016 in beach volleyball
Continental Beach Volleyball Cup